The canton of Le Val-d'Ajol is an administrative division of the Vosges department, in northeastern France. It was created at the French canton reorganisation which came into effect in March 2015. Its seat is in Le Val-d'Ajol.

It consists of the following communes:

Bellefontaine
La Chapelle-aux-Bois
Charmois-l'Orgueilleux
Le Clerjus
Dounoux
Fontenoy-le-Château
Girmont-Val-d'Ajol
Grandrupt-de-Bains
Gruey-lès-Surance
Hadol
La Haye
Montmotier
Plombières-les-Bains
Trémonzey 
Uriménil
Uzemain
Le Val-d'Ajol
Vioménil
La Vôge-les-Bains
Les Voivres
Xertigny

References

Cantons of Vosges (department)